The Rocket Red Brigade is a DC Comics superhero team. They first appeared in Green Lantern Corps #208 (January 1987), and were created by Steve Englehart and Joe Staton.

History
Originally created for the Soviet Union by Green Lantern Kilowog, the Rocket Red Brigade — normal human beings enhanced using "forced evolution" and armoured battle-suits — proudly defended the USSR.

Their abilities included super strength, invulnerability, flight (through rocket packs/boots), the ability to project powerful energy blasts and "mecha-empathy" — the ability to sense and control computers and machines (though to what extent is not clear).

Their name is likely a play on the phrase "rocket's red glare" from The Star-Spangled Banner, and Red Brigade.

Rocket Red #1
Decorated Russian soldier Josef Denisovich was a close friend of the alien Green Lantern Kilowog. He was also the first member of the Rocket Red Brigade. Josef was turned against Kilowog by the Soviet government, and died fighting Kilowog.

Rocket Red #4

Rocket Red #7
The man known as Vladimir Mikoyan turned out to be a Manhunter. Vladmir was the first Rocket Red admitted into Justice League International. During the Millennium event, he was exposed as a Manhunter android and destroyed by Booster Gold (with the assistance of the Justice League and a force of other, human, Rocket Reds).

After the Manhunter was discovered, Dimitri Pushkin was admitted into the Justice League.

Pozhar

While serving as a member of the Red Shadows, Mikhail Denisovitch Arkadin, the Russian hero also known as Pozhar, wore a modified suit of Rocket Red armor.

Russian Mafia
After the Soviet Union collapsed, the other Rocket Reds fell on hard times. Several were brainwashed to serve as agents of the super-criminal Sonar. Many of the suits ended up on the black market. As seen in the pages of Chase #3 (April 1998), some of the more unscrupulous Rocket Reds began working for the Russian Organizatsiya Mafiya in order to feed their families.

Under Vandal Savage's control
Later four of the suits came into the possession of Vandal Savage. He imprisoned four of the Titans, Jesse Quick, Arsenal, Tempest, and temporary member Supergirl, in them and used them as missiles. He managed to destroy the South American city of Montevideo, Uruguay though Tempest managed to save himself. The other Titans were saved as well before their respective suits could detonate.

Rockets fly again

Surviving members of the Rocket Red Brigade took their armor back from the Russian Army to fight the world prison break during the events of Villains United. They also appeared protecting Russia's border in 52, wearing new, more advanced suits of armor. They were seen again in One Year Later protecting Russia while hindering Green Lantern Hal Jordan's attempt to apprehend an interstellar criminal in Green Lantern #10. After the ensuing situation was resolved, the current Rocket Red #1 is even promoted as a possible Justice League member in the future, should the League plan to expand. Ice was hidden in a suit of Rocket Red armor during her regeneration.

In Checkmate v.2 #22, it is revealed that Checkmate has since recruited the current Rocket Red # 1, Captain Maks Chazov, as its White Queen's Knight, with the apparent consent of Chazov's Russian government superiors.

In Blackest Night #3, the Rocket Reds were briefly seen in battle with Dimitri Pushkin, whose body had been reanimated as a Black Lantern.

In Justice League of America #45, the League meets the German Rakete-Auslese, or "Rocket Elite", who Batman notes are the German equivalent of the Rocket Reds, and use some of the same technology in their flying battlesuits.

During Mon-El's tour of the earth, he visits Moscow and helps the Rocket Reds during a battle with Georgian terrorists. Afterwards, a female Rocket Red pilot named Ivana takes Mon on a tour of St. Basil's Cathedral and gives him the first kiss he's ever received from a human.

The Rocket Red Brigade appears in Justice League: Generation Lost #4. One of their former number who had served under the USSR, Gavril Ivanovich, joins the members of the former Justice League International in tracking down Maxwell Lord. In The New 52 rebooted DC's continuity, Gavril is admitted into the new, United Nations-sanctioned Justice League as the official representative of Russia.

In other media

Television
 An unidentified Rocket Red resembling Dmitri Pushkin makes brief appearances in the Justice League Unlimited episodes "The Return" and "Panic in the Sky". This version is a member of the Justice League.
 The Dmitri Pushkin incarnation of Rocket Red appears in the Batman: The Brave and the Bold episode "Crisis: 22,300 Miles Above Earth".
 The Rocket Red Brigade appears in the Young Justice: Outsiders episode "Leverage". This version of the group was created the Russian government to serve as their equivalent to the Justice League, is led by Commander Olga Illyich / Rocket Red No. 1 (voiced by Stephanie Lemelin), and also consists of new member Dmitri Pushkin / Rocket Red No. 4 (voiced by Steve Blum).

Toys
 Rocket Red was released as a single packed action figure in Mattel's Justice League Unlimited DC Superheroes toy line.
 Rocket Red has also become part of Mattel's DC Universe Classics-based Signature Series, as a distinctly larger figure available through Mattel's online outlet at MattyCollector.Com.

See also
 List of Russian superheroes

References

External links
 DCU Guide: Rocket Red Brigade
 DCU Guide: Rocket Red Brigade chronology
 Cosmic Teams: Rocket Red Brigade
 DCU Guide: Rocket Red #1
 DCU Guide: Rocket Red #7
 DCU Guide: Rocket Red #4

DC Comics superhero teams
Comics characters introduced in 1987
Fictional Russian people
Fictional Soviet people
Characters created by Steve Englehart
Soviet Union-themed superheroes
Fictional Soviet Army personnel